Numbers was a literary magazine published twice a year in Cambridge, England, between 1986 and 1990. Six issues of the magazine appeared, of which the last was a double issue to celebrate the ninetieth birthday of the American poet and novelist Janet Lewis. Issue 4 was a celebration of the Portuguese poet Fernando Pessoa.

Each issue contained an editorial, poems, translations and prose by poets.

Numbers was founded and edited by John Alexander, Alison Rimmer, Peter Robinson and Clive Wilmer.

The magazine emerged from the editors' involvement with the 1977 to 1985 Cambridge Poetry Festivals, and with the exhibition Pound's Artists at Kettle's Yard and the Tate Gallery.

Contributors
Notable contributors to the magazine included:

References

Biannual magazines published in the United Kingdom
Defunct literary magazines published in the United Kingdom
Magazines established in 1986
Magazines disestablished in 1990
Mass media in Cambridge
Poetry magazines published in the United Kingdom